Sharon Hodgson  (born 1 April 1966) is a British Labour Party politician serving as the Member of Parliament (MP) for Washington and Sunderland West, previously Gateshead East and Washington West, since 2005.

Hodgson was elected Chair of the Commons Finance Committee in March 2023. She previously served as Parliamentary Private Secretary (PPS) to the Leader of the Opposition, Keir Starmer, from May 2021 to March 2023, and has served in various front bench roles under Labour leaders Ed Miliband and Jeremy Corbyn.

Early life
Hodgson was born in Gateshead, County Durham and was educated locally at Greenwell Junior High School and Heathfield Senior High School, where she obtained eight O-Levels. After leaving school, she worked as an accounts clerk in the Team Valley, then attended Newcastle College and the Trades Union Congress Academy in London.

Hodgson later worked for Northern Rock in Gosforth, and then as a payroll and accounting clerk for local companies. After being a full-time mother for a few years in the mid-1990s, and volunteering for the Labour Party in Stockton-on-Tees during the 1997 general election campaign, she became a party organiser in 1999.

In 2000, she became the local Party organiser for two years in the Mitcham and Morden constituency, helping the sitting Labour MP Siobhain McDonagh to be re-elected at the 2001 general election. Before her election to Parliament, Hodgson worked as Labour Link Officer for UNISON.

She was elected for two years as the women's officer within the Tyne Bridge Constituency Labour Party (CLP) in 1998. In 2002, she was elected as the secretary of the Mitcham and Morden CLP in the London Borough of Merton.

Parliamentary career
In 2004, Hodgson was chosen as the official Labour candidate for Gateshead East and Washington West at the 2005 general election. Her selection followed the retirement of the sitting Labour MP Joyce Quin, and came about as a result of an all-woman shortlist.  Hodgson held the seat with a majority of 13,407 votes, and gave her maiden speech in the House of Commons on 25 May 2005.

Following boundary changes, the constituency of Gateshead East and Washington West was abolished and replaced by two new seats, Gateshead and Washington and Sunderland West at the 2010 general election. David Clelland, then MP for Tyne Bridge, was chosen in December 2006 by Labour Party members to become the candidate for the Gateshead constituency at the next general election.

Following her failure to be selected for the Gateshead seat, Hodgson announced her intention to run for selection as the Labour Party candidate for the new Washington and Sunderland West seat in September 2007, and she was selected. She was elected as the MP for that seat in the 2010 general election with a majority of 11,458.

In Parliament, she has served on several select committees since her election in 2005, including the North East Regional Committee and the Children Schools and Families Committee. She has also served as the Parliamentary Private Secretary to Liam Byrne in the Home Office, Bob Ainsworth at the Ministry of Defence and Dawn Primarolo at the Department of Health. In June 2009, Hodgson was promoted to the position of assistant Government Whip.

In opposition, the then Leader of the Labour Party Ed Miliband, appointed Hodgson to the Shadow Children and Families Office in October 2010. She resigned from the role and supported Owen Smith in the failed attempt to replace Jeremy Corbyn in the 2016 Labour leadership election. Three months later, in October 2016, she was appointed the Shadow Minister for Public Health. In Keir Starmer's first opposition frontbench, Hodgson was appointed Shadow Minister for Veterans. In May 2021 Starmer appointed Hodgson his parliamentary private secretary.

Affiliations
Hodgson is a vice-chair of Labour Friends of Israel.

References

External links
 Official website

1966 births
Living people
People from Gateshead
Politicians from Tyne and Wear
Female members of the Parliament of the United Kingdom for English constituencies
Labour Party (UK) MPs for English constituencies
Labour Friends of Israel
UK MPs 2005–2010
UK MPs 2010–2015
UK MPs 2015–2017
UK MPs 2017–2019
21st-century British women politicians
UK MPs 2019–present
21st-century English women
21st-century English people